Aubelin Jolicoeur (April 30, 1924 – February 14, 2005) was a Haitian journalist and columnist who frequented Haiti's Hotel Oloffson for 40 years.

Information
He once played piano with Bobby Short at the Oloffson "La Belle Epoque Créole", of the 1970s. He was the inspiration to Petit Pierre in Graham Greene's 1966 novel The Comedians.

References

1924 births
2005 deaths
Haitian journalists
People from Port-au-Prince
20th-century journalists